Take Back the Universe and Give Me Yesterday is a studio album by Creeper Lagoon.  The song "Wrecking Ball" was featured in the films Vanilla Sky and Hellboy.  The song "Under the Tracks" was featured in the movie Orange County.

Track listing

 "Chance of a Lifetime" – 3:45
 "Wrecking Ball" – 4:03
 "Sunfair" – 3:51
 "She Loves Me Not" – 1:04
 "Up All Night" – 3:10
 "Naked Days" – 5:02
 "Under the Tracks" – 4:16
 "Dead Man Saloon" – 3:28
 "Hey Sister" – 3:07
 "Cellophane" – 3:48
 "Keep from Moving" – 7:15
 "Lover's Leap" – 4:03
 "Here We Are" – 3:37

Additional musicians

 Jerry Harrison – Swirly keyboard instruments on "Under the Tracks"
 Mark Endert – additional arrangement  and mutator electronics on "Wrecking Ball"
 Natalie Jackson – background vocals on "Keep from Moving"
 Ken Andrews – additional background vocals on "Sunfair"

Production credits

 Producers: Dave Fridmann, Greg Wells, Mark Trombino, Rick Stone, Jerry Harrison, Creeper Lagoon
 Engineers: Tom Banghart, Eric Thorngren, Dave Fridmann, Creeper Lagoon
 Mixed by: Ken Andrews, Tom Lord-Alge, Creeper Lagoon

References

2001 albums
Creeper Lagoon albums
Albums produced by Jerry Harrison
DreamWorks Records albums